Scopula perstrigulata is a moth of the family Geometridae. It is found in South Africa and Zimbabwe.

References

Moths described in 1913
perstrigulata
Moths of Africa